Teucinde of Arles (or Theusinde, Teucinda) was a Burgundian aristocrat who lived in Arles, Provence, and was known for her numerous donations to the Arles Church.

Life

Teucinde was a woman of the Burgundian aristocracy who followed Hugues d'Arles to Provence and belonged to the family of the counts of Cavaillon.
She was the daughter of the Count of Apt, known by the nickname of Griffon, appointed by King Conrad I of Burgundy in 948 or 949.
Her brother was Gontard, the provost of the Cathedral of Arles.
Her nephew was Majolus, the fourth abbot of Cluny.

A very pious woman, whom some texts describe as a sancto monialis or Deo devota, Teucinde distributed her goods to the religious communities of Arles under the archbishops of Arles, Manasses and Ithier.
On 7 October 949, she bought the island of Montmajour, which belonged to the archbishopric of Arles, and donated it to the Benedictine monks who lived there.
Montmajour Abbey was founded there.
Teucinde confirmed this donation in her will in 977.
On 19 July 973 Teucinde obtained from Archbishop Ithier the concession of Saint-Hippolyte near Arles for her and her nephew Riculf, Bishop of Fréjus.
They were to rebuild it, restore it, and own it until the end of their days.

Teucinde's gravestone was found in the 1970s on private property near Montmajour Abbey.

Notes

References

Sources

920s births
970s deaths
Year of birth uncertain
Year of death uncertain
Kingdom of Burgundy
History of Arles